Larry Vásquez Ortega (born 19 September 1992) is a Colombian professional footballer who plays as a midfielder for Millonarios.

References

External links 
 
 Larry Vasquez at Diario AS
 Larry Vasquez at GOL Caracol
 

Living people
1992 births
Colombian footballers
Colombian expatriate footballers
Categoría Primera A players
Categoría Primera B players
Liga MX players
Academia F.C. players
Patriotas Boyacá footballers
Tigres UANL footballers
América de Cali footballers
Deportes Tolima footballers
Atlético Junior footballers
Association football midfielders
Expatriate footballers in Mexico
Colombian expatriate sportspeople in Mexico
People from Norte de Santander Department